Easter fires, also called Paschal fires, are typically bonfires lit at Easter as part of liturgical and secular celebrations.

Liturgy
 Used in solemn Roman Catholic, Lutheran, Reformed, Anglican, and Methodist celebrations of the Easter Vigil held after sunset on Holy Saturday, concluding the Paschal Triduum. Such a fire might be used to light a Paschal candle or other candles used symbolically before or during Mass or other religious celebration.

As a sacrament in remembrance of the Resurrection of Jesus, the Catholic mass according to Roman rite begins with a big celebration of light (Lucernarium): an open fire is lighted outside the church and blessed by the priest; when the Paschal candle is lit, the community ceremoniously enters the dark church chanting Lumen Christi and Deo gratias.

The Easter Vigil liturgies of the Roman Catholic, Lutheran, Anglican, Methodist and Presbyterian Churches are nearly identical. 

According to the Eastern Orthodox tradition of the Holy Fire, worshippers light candles from the Paschal trikirion during service at Saturday Midnight, while the troparion is sung.

Customs

German regions 

Though not documented before the 16th century, the custom presumably is based on Saxon, pre-Christian traditions, that are still performed each year. There are several explanations of the meaning of these fires. The Saxons probably believed that around the time of Easter, Spring becomes victorious over Winter. The fires were supposed to help chase the darkness and winter away. It was also a symbol of fertility, which works in a literal sense in that the ashes were scattered over the meadows and thereby fertilized the soil. Another possible origin of the Easter fire is that of St. Patrick lighting an unquenchable "High King" fire in defiance of the throne on the night before Easter of 432AD. The fire is symbolic of the undimmed light of Christ despite the pagan government's attempts to put it out and marked the beginning of the conversion of Ireland to Christianity. This fire reminds Christianity of the Eternal High Kingship of Christ.

In Northern Germany, Easter Fires are lit around sunset on Holy Saturday.

In some Old Bavarian regions, the Burning of Judas on Holy Saturday is still common.

Netherlands 

Easter fires also exist in the Netherlands.

USA 
In Fredericksburg, Texas, each year the residents have Easter Fires the night before Easter, commemorating a peace treaty with the Comanche Indians. In 1847 when the original treaty was signed, the Comanches lit signal fires on the area hills.

South Slavs 
Amongst South Slavs (Serbs, Montenegrins, Slovenes, Croats, Bulgarians, Macedonians, Bunjevci and Šokci), it is required to jump over the flames of Easter.

See also
 Biikebrennen (similar custom in North Frisia)
 Burgbrennen (very similar custom in Luxembourg)
 Chaharshanbe Suri (similar custom in Iran, Azerbaijan, Afghanistan and Tajikistan)
 Funkenfeuer (similar custom in Swabian-Alemannic area)
 Holy Fire
 Hüttenbrennen (similar custom in the Eifel)
 Luminaria (vigil fire)
 Sechseläuten (similar Swiss custom in Zürich)
 Victimae paschali laudes

References

External links

Easter traditions
Slavic Easter traditions
Traditions involving fire